Aglia Iliadhi (born 30 November 2004) is an Albanian footballer who plays as a midfielder for Apolonia and the Albania national team.

International career
Iliadhi made her debut for the Albania national team on 30 November 2021, coming on as a substitute for Qendresa Krasniqi against Kosovo.

References

2004 births
Living people
Women's association football midfielders
Albanian women's footballers
Albania women's international footballers
FK Apolonia Fier (women) players
Footballers from Vlorë
Albanian footballers